Walker Development Centre is a public alternative school in Grand Forks, British Columbia part of School District 51 Boundary. Walker Development Centre, has a principal and four staff members, a junior teacher, a senior teacher, a youth worker, and a secretary. It is commonly known by students and faculty as either 'Fred,' 'Walker,' or 'WDC.' WDC has a junior class for grades 8–9, a senior program for grades 10–12, and an adult program for adult students. It was named after former teacher, Fred Walker.

References

Schools in British Columbia